The 1971 South Africa rugby union tour of Australia was a controversial six-week rugby union tour by the Springboks to Australia. Anti-apartheid protests came to being all around the country.The tour is perhaps most infamous for a state of emergency being declared in Queensland.In total, around 700 people were arrested whilst the Springboks were on tour.

Overview
The first games were then played in Adelaide and Perth, which were disrupted mainly by youth-led protesters. The third match was set to take place in Melbourne. A 5,000 strong crowd, made up mostly of university students, gathered in the streets of Melbourne to march on Olympic Park in protest. Police had set up a wall of units around the stadium, around 650 policemen many armed with batons and some on horseback.

In Sydney, several people, including the Secretary of the New South Wales Builders Labourers Federation, attempted to saw down the goal posts at the Sydney Cricket Ground prior to the match. In addition, a gigantic anti-apartheid effigy was hung from the Sydney Harbour Bridge but subsequently cut down.

Queensland premier Joh Bjelke-Petersen declared a month-long state of emergency. Protests at the Tower Mill Motel where the South African team were staying were responded to by police. The game was instead played at the Exhibition Ground, being moved from its original venue at Ballymore, as it was deemed easier to erect barricades at the Exhibition Ground. A two-metre chain wire fence was erected to separate players and spectators.

According to Meredith Burgmann and Peter McGregor, both leading firebrands, the rugby tour was a crucial target but to stop the summer's cricketing visit was the ultimate goal. They were successful in this regard as the cricket tour was called off due to security reasons.

Fixtures 
Scores and results list South Africa's points tally first.

Touring group

 Manager Flappie Lochner
 Coach Johan Claassen

Hookers

 Piston van Wyk
 Robbie Barnard

Props

 Hannes Marais (capt)
 Sakkie Sauermann
 Martiens Louw

Locks

 Frik du Preez
 John Williams
 Johan Spies

Loose Forwards

 Tommy Bedford
 Morne du Plessis
 Jan Ellis
 Piet Greyling
 Thys Lourens
 Albie Bates as replacement

Fullbacks

 Ian McCallum
 Tonie Roux

Wings

 Syd Nomis
 Gert Muller
 Hannes Viljoen
 Andy van der Watt as replacement

Centres

 Peter Cronje
 Joggie Jansen
 Peter Swanson

Flyhalves

 Piet Visagie
 Dawie Snyman

Scrumhalves

 Joggie Viljoen
 Dirk de Vos

Test matches
South Africa won the Test Series 3–0

 17 July 1971 – Sydney Cricket Ground, Sydney, South Africa 19–11 Australia
South Africa: McCallum, Nomis, Cronje, Jansen, Viljoen, Visagie, J Viljoen, Du Plessis, Ellis, Greyling, Williams, Du Preez, Marais (c), Van Wyk and Sauermann

Tries by Hannes Viljoen, Joggie Viljoen and Jan Ellis. Ian McCallum 2 conversions and penalty and Piet Visagie drop goal.

Australia Captain Greg Davis

 31 July 1971 – Brisbane Exhibition Ground, Brisbane, South Africa 14–6 Australia
 7 August 1971 – Sydney Cricket Ground, Sydney. South Africa 18–6 Australia

See also
1981 South Africa rugby union tour of New Zealand

References 
 Meredith Burgmann. The Sydney Morning Herald. "The day apartheid was hit for six." 23 August 2008.
 http://www.theage.com.au/articles/2005/04/25/1114281482045.html
 https://web.archive.org/web/20060830170604/http://www.rugby.com.au/news/2001_july/springbok_tour_protests_remembered_11613,4223.html
 http://media.uow.edu.au/releases/2001/springboks.html
 https://web.archive.org/web/20060509142114/http://www.epa.qld.gov.au/cultural_heritage/places_and_meanings/ekka_history/sport_at_the_exhibition_grounds/ 
 https://web.archive.org/web/20060525053431/http://www.ausport.gov.au/fulltext/2001/sportsf/s320787.htm
 https://web.archive.org/web/20060825053755/http://www.cpa.org.au/garchve05/1252worth.html
 https://web.archive.org/web/20050326184551/http://www.abc.net.au/rn/history/hindsight/stories/s938629.htm

Notes

External links
Breaking the rules: the campaign in Australia against apartheid
History Of The Game includes match image.
Australians block cricket and impede rugby tour of apartheid South Africa, 1971, The Commons Library

Springbok tour
Springbok tour
Springbok tour
Sports riots
South Africa national rugby team tours of Australia
South Africa Rugby Union Tour of Australia, 1971
Rugby union controversies
Rugby union and apartheid
Springbok tour
Sports scandals in Australia